Mokroye is a rural locality (a village) in Demidovskoye Rural Settlement, Gus-Khrustalny District, Vladimir Oblast, Russia. The population was 234 as of 2010. The village of Mokroye is sometimes mentioned in Fyodor Dostoevsky's novel The Brothers Karamazov.

Geography 
Mokroye is located on the Karaslitsa River, 42 km southwest of Gus-Khrustalny (the district's administrative centre) by road. Orlovo is the nearest rural locality.

References 

Rural localities in Gus-Khrustalny District